The Dickey-Birdsong Plantation is a  historic district that was listed on the National Register of Historic Places in 1995.  It includes four contributing buildings, five contributing structures, and a contributing site.  It is a wildlife preserve.

It has a 1912 dwelling, the "Dickey-Komarek House", which includes Classical Revival architectural details, and is a frame one-and-a-half-story building built in 1912 by expanding upon a mid-1800s dogtrot house.  It has an 1858 barn and outbuildings built in the 1900s.

The property was purchased from the Dickey family in 1938.  It became a site of ecological research and fire experimentation.

The property is now the Birdsong Nature Center and is located on what is now known as Birdsong Rd. Birdsong Nature Center was created as a 501c3 corporation in 1986.  Its mission is "to foster awareness, understanding, and appreciation of nature and its interrelationships."

References

Houses on the National Register of Historic Places in Georgia (U.S. state)
Neoclassical architecture in Georgia (U.S. state)
Houses completed in 1912
National Register of Historic Places in Grady County, Georgia
Plantations in Georgia (U.S. state)
Nature centers in Georgia (U.S. state)